is a Japanese football player who plays for Kawasaki Frontale. He played for Japan national team.

Club career
Born in Hyogo Prefecture, Ienaga began his career as a trainee with Gamba Osaka, one of the leading clubs in Japan's J1 League. He broke into the senior squad in 2004 and helped the club to their first J1 League title the following year. Ienaga joined J1 League rivals Oita Trinita on a season-long loan in 2007. In December 2008, Ienaga joined English club, Plymouth Argyle, on trial. Plymouth attempted to sign the player in January 2009 but he was denied a work permit so they were forced to withdraw from talks. In December 2010, he signed with Spanish Primera Division club RCD Mallorca in a five-year deal. And scored his first goal for the club in home game against Sevilla on 9 April 2011.

International career
In June 2005, Ienaga was selected Japan U-20 national team for 2005 World Youth Championship. At this tournament, he played all 4 matches as left midfielder.

Ienaga made his international debut as a substitute in Japan's 2–0 win against Peru in March 2007.

Career statistics

Club

1Includes other competitive competitions, including the Japanese Super Cup, A3 Champions Cup, Suruga Bank Championship and Pan-Pacific Championship.

International

International goals
Scores and results list Japan's goal tally first.

Under-23

Appearances in major competitions

Awards and honours

Club
Gamba Osaka
 J1 League: 2005
 J.League Cup: 2007
 Japanese Super Cup: 2007

Oita Trinita
 J.League Cup: 2008

Kawasaki Frontale
 J1 League: 2017, 2018, 2020, 2021
 Emperor's Cup: 2020
 J.League Cup: 2019
 Japanese Super Cup: 2019, 2021

International
Japan
 Kirin Cup: 2011

Individual
 J.League MVP Award: 2018
 J.League Best XI: 2018, 2020, 2021, 2022

References

External links

Japan National Football Team Database

Profile at Omiya Ardija
Profile at Kawasaki Frontale

1986 births
Living people
Association football people from Hyōgo Prefecture
Japanese footballers
Japan youth international footballers
Japan international footballers
J1 League players
J2 League players
La Liga players
K League 1 players
Gamba Osaka players
Oita Trinita players
Cerezo Osaka players
RCD Mallorca players
Ulsan Hyundai FC players
Omiya Ardija players
Kawasaki Frontale players
Japanese expatriate footballers
Expatriate footballers in Spain
Japanese expatriate sportspeople in Spain
Expatriate footballers in South Korea
Japanese expatriate sportspeople in South Korea
Footballers at the 2006 Asian Games
Association football wingers
J1 League Player of the Year winners
Asian Games competitors for Japan